Lullaby Girl is the eighth studio album by American musician Lisa Loeb. The album was released under Furious Rose Productions label on October 6, 2017.

Composition 
The album is a compilation of cover songs, as well as two originals. While being a mostly acoustic album, as seen on Loeb's music videos, the album is meant to be peaceful, melodic, and whimsical to the ear.

Recording 
Lullaby Girl features a quartet led by keyboardist Larry Goldings. The album includes Loebs and Goldings's arrangements of Dionne Warwick's "What the World Needs Now Is Love", the Five Stairsteps's "O-o-h Child", and Fleetwood Mac's "Don't Stop".

Track listing

References

External links
 Music video for title track, "Lullaby Girl"

2017 albums
Lisa Loeb albums
Covers albums
Self-released albums